The 1888 United States presidential election in Vermont took place on November 6, 1888, as part of the 1888 United States presidential election. Voters chose four representatives, or electors to the Electoral College, who voted for president and vice president.

Vermont voted for the Republican nominee, Benjamin Harrison, over the Democratic nominee, incumbent President Grover Cleveland. Harrison won Vermont by a margin of 43.40%.

With 69.05% of the popular vote, Vermont would be Harrison's strongest victory in terms of percentage in the popular vote.

Vice President-elect Levi P. Morton was born in Shoreham, Vermont.

Results

Results by county

See also
 United States presidential elections in Vermont

Notes

References

Vermont
1888
1888 Vermont elections